Emeline Hurd Hill Richardson (June 6, 1910 in Buffalo, New York – August 29, 1999 in Durham, North Carolina) was an American classical archaeologist and Etruscan scholar.  Hill was the daughter of William Hurd Hill and Emeleen Carlisle (Hill). She studied at Radcliffe College, receiving an A.B. in 1932 and an M.A. in 1935. In 1935/36 she studied with Bernard Ashmole at the University of London. She completed her  Ph.D. in 1939 at Radcliffe College. From 1941 to 1949 she was on the faculty of Wheaton College in Norton, Massachusetts. In 1950, Emeline Hill Richardson held a stipend at the American Academy in Rome and was involved in the Cosa excavations. She married Lawrence Richardson in 1952. She lectured both at Stanford and Yale Universities.

From 1968 until 1979, Richardson was Professor of Classical Archaeology at the University of North Carolina at Chapel Hill. The primary focus of her research was the civilization of the Etruscans. She was elected a Fellow of the American Academy of Arts and Sciences in 1974. She was a member of the Archaeological Institute of America, the American Philological Association and a corresponding member of the Deutsches Archäologisches Institut (DAI). In 1994, she received the Gold Medal for Distinguished Archaeological Achievement from the Archaeological Institute of America. She was also awarded a centennial medal of the American Academy in Rome in 1994.

Her major study votive bronze objects of the Etruscan civilization appeared in 1983.

Publications
Brown, Frank Edward – Richardson, Emeline – Richardson, Lawrence, Cosa II: the temples of the Arx (Rome 1960).
Richardson, Emeline, The Etruscans: their art and civilization (Chicago 1964).
Richardson, Emeline, Etruscan Votive Bronzes: Geometric, Orientalizing, Archaic (Mainz 1983).
Brown, Frank Edward – Hill Richardson, Emeline – Richardson, Lawrence, Cosa III: the buildings of the forum; colony, municipium, and village (Pennsylvania State Univ. Press 1993).

Necrology
Richardson jr., L. 2000. "Emeline Hill Richardson, 1910-1999." American Journal of Archaeology 104.1:125.
Nancy T. de Grummond. 2000. "Emeline Hill Richardson (1910 – 1999)." Etruscan Studies 7.1:27-9. DOI: 10.1515/etst.2000.7.1.27.

Sources
Dictionary of Art Historians: Richardson, Emeline Hurd Hill, née Hill

References

1910 births
1999 deaths
American classical scholars
Women classical scholars
Scientists from Buffalo, New York
Radcliffe College alumni
Wheaton College (Massachusetts) faculty
Classical scholars of the University of North Carolina at Chapel Hill
Fellows of the American Academy of Arts and Sciences
Classical archaeologists
Linguists of Etruscan
American women archaeologists
20th-century American archaeologists
20th-century American women
American women academics
Historians from New York (state)